Piskar is a village in Sindhupalchok District in the Bagmati Zone of central Nepal. At the time of the 1991 Nepal census it had a population of 1870 and had 366 houses in the village.

References

Populated places in Sindhupalchowk District